Oswald Robert Armstrong (30 May 1892 – 1 March 1958) was an Australian rules footballer who played with Geelong in the Victorian Football League (VFL).

Family
The son of Thomas Armstrong (1855-1910), and Elizabeth Jane Armstrong (1859-1946), née Spinks, Oswald Robert Armstrong was born at Geelong on 30 May 1892.

He married Mary Veronica Betts (1893-1964) in 1911.

Football

Geelong (VFL)
Recruited from the Barwon Football Club, he played his first match for Geelong against St Kilda at the Junction Oval, on 3 July 1915. Overall, he played in five First XVIII games for Geelong, with his last game being that against Fitzroy, at the Brunswick Street Oval, on 21 August 1915, when Geelong was thrashed by Fitzroy, 18.13 (121) to 4.7 (31).

Training Units team (AIF)
He played for the (losing) Australian Training Units team in the famous "Pioneer Exhibition Game" of Australian Rules football, held in London, in October 1916. A news film was taken at the match.

Barwon Football Club
On his return from active overseas service with the First AIF, Geelong cleared Armstrong back to Barwon.

Military service
He served overseas with the First AIF. He was captured by the Germans on 11 April 1917, and was a prisoner of war.

Death
He died at Breamlea, Victoria on 1 March 1958.

See also
 1916 Pioneer Exhibition Game

Notes

References
 
 Pioneer Exhibition Game Australian Football: in aid of British and French Red Cross Societies: 3rd Australian Division v. Australian Training Units at Queen's Club, West Kensington, on Saturday, October 28th, 1916, at 3pm, Wightman & Co., (London), 1919.
 First World War Embarkation Roll: Private Oswald Robert Armstrong (5972), collection of the Australian War Museum. 
 First World War Nominal Record: Oswald Robert Armstrong (5972), collection of the Australian War Museum.
 Australian Red Cross Wounded and Missing Files, 1914-18 War: 1DRL/0428: 5972 Private Oswald Robert Armstrong: 14th Battalion, collection of the Australian War Museum.
 First World War Service Record: Oswald Robert Armstrong (5972), National Archives of Australia.

External links 
 
 

1892 births
1958 deaths
Australian rules footballers from Geelong
Geelong Football Club players
Participants in "Pioneer Exhibition Game" (London, 28 October 1916)
Barwon Football Club players
Australian military personnel of World War I
Military personnel from Victoria (Australia)
World War I prisoners of war held by Germany